One Million Dollars may refer to:

 Hard Time for Princes or One Million Dollars, a 1965 Italian comedy film
 One Million Dollars, a 1915 film by John W. Noble

See also
 Dr. Evil, a fictional character who holds the world ransom for $1 million
 Million dollar bill
 
 Millionaire (disambiguation)
 One million (disambiguation)
 Dollar (disambiguation)